The 2004 Formula 3 International Series was the 54th British Formula 3 International Series season. It commenced on 3 April, and ended on 1 October after twenty-four races.

Drivers and teams
The following teams and drivers were competitors in the 2004 British Formula 3 International Series. The Scholarship class is for older Formula Three cars. Teams in the Invitation class are not series regulars, and do not compete for championship points.

Calendar and results

Notes:
1. – The second race at the first Silverstone meeting was cancelled due to poor weather conditions. It was run at the Snetterton meeting.

Standings

Championship Class

References

External links
 The official website of the British Formula 3 Championship

British Formula Three Championship seasons
Formula Three season
British
British Formula 3 Championship